Janek Sirrs (born October 20, 1965) is visual effects artist who is known for his work in films such as The Matrix, Batman Begins, The Avengers and The Hunger Games: Catching Fire.

Oscars
Sirrs has won the Academy Award for Best Visual Effects once, with a further two nominations. All of the following are in this category:

 72nd Academy Awards-The Matrix, shared with John Gaeta, Steve Courtley and Jon Thum. Won. 
 83rd Academy Awards-Iron Man 2, nomination shared with Ben Snow, Dan Sudick and Ged Wright. Lost to Inception. 
 85th Academy Awards-The Avengers, nomination shared with Dan Sudick, Jeff White and Guy Williams. Lost to Life of Pi.

Selected filmography
 Doctor Strange in the Multiverse of Madness (2022)
 Spider-Man: Far from Home (2019)
 Spider-Man: Homecoming (2017)
 Terminator Genisys (2015)
 The Hunger Games: Catching Fire (2013)
 The Avengers (2012) 
 Iron Man 2 (2010)
 I Am Legend (2007)
 Batman Begins (2005)
 The Matrix Reloaded (2003)
 The Matrix (1999)
 Dr. Dolittle (1998)
 Mighty Joe Young (1998)
 The Truman Show (1998)
 Con Air (1997)
 Dante's Peak (1997)
 Mars Attacks! (1996)
 The Nutty Professor (1996)
 Executive Decision (1996)
 The Arrival (1996)
 White Squall (1996)
 Waterworld (1995)
 Braveheart (1995)
 The Quick and the Dead (1995)
 Last Action Hero (1993)
 The Muppet Christmas Carol (1992)

References

External links
 
 https://variety.com/t/janek-sirrs/

Living people
1965 births
Best Visual Effects Academy Award winners
Best Visual Effects BAFTA Award winners
Special effects people